Samantha Leigh Stewart (born 12 October 1989) is a Canadian freestyle wrestler. She won one of the bronze medals in the women's 53 kg event at the 2021 World Wrestling Championships in Oslo, Norway. She won the silver medal in the women's 53 kg event at the 2022 Commonwealth Games held in Birmingham, England.

In 2022, Stewart won the bronze medal in her event at the Matteo Pellicone Ranking Series 2022 held in Rome, Italy. She competed in the 53kg event at the 2022 World Wrestling Championships held in Belgrade, Serbia.

Stewart has a bachelor of recreation and sport studies, a bachelor of arts with honours in psychology, and a mMaster of education in counselling from the University of New Brunswick.

Stewart is the executive director for Lutte New Brunswick Wrestling 

She currently competes out of New Brunswick.

References

External links 
 

1989 births
Living people
Canadian female sport wrestlers
Sportspeople from London, Ontario
World Wrestling Championships medalists
Wrestlers at the 2022 Commonwealth Games
Commonwealth Games silver medallists for Canada
Commonwealth Games medallists in wrestling
University of New Brunswick alumni
21st-century Canadian women
Medallists at the 2022 Commonwealth Games